The AIC Serie A Referee of the Year is a yearly award organized by the Italian Footballers' Association (AIC) given to the referee who has been considered to have performed the best over the previous Serie A season. The award is part of the Gran Galà del Calcio (former Oscar del Calcio) awards event.

Winners

References

External links
 List of Oscar del Calcio winners on the AIC official website
 List of Gran Galà del Calcio winners on the AIC official website

Serie A trophies and awards
Oscar del Calcio
Awards established in 1997
1997 establishments in Italy